Siphonalia pfefferi, common name Pfeffer's whelk, is a species of sea snail, a marine gastropod mollusk in the family Buccinidae, the true whelks.

Description
Siphonalia pfefferi has a shell that reaches a length of 40–50 mm. The shape of this shell is ovate, with several prominent ribs per whorl and a siphonal canal slightly recurved. The surface has a white or cream-yellow background color, with small orange or pale brown spots. Interior has an orange coloration, with white inner lip of the aperture.

Distribution
This species is endemic to southern Japan, mainly in Kii Peninsula and southward.

Habitat
It lives on sandy bottoms, at a depth of 10–50 m.

References
 WoRMS
 Encyclopedia of Life
 

Buccinidae
Gastropods described in 1900